Nemertes Research is an American research-advisory firm that specializes in analyzing and quantifying the business value of emerging technologies headquartered in Lusby, MD. The Times called it "a respected American think-tank", while others mention its name as a concrete example in an article criticizing "unscrupulous think tanks".

Research focus areas
Nemertes Research focuses in the following areas:

 Cloud Analytics and Automation: AI, ML, and RPA
 Cybersecurity and Risk Management
 Digital Customer Experience
 Digital Workplace
 Internet of Things
 Next-Generation Networking

Internet infrastructure
In 2007 and 2008 Nemertes published widely publicized reports on Internet infrastructure trends focusing on bandwidth demand versus build-out, and more recently, logical Internet issues involving IP address depletion and route table scalability. In particular, its widely noted report, "Internet Interrupted: Why Architectural Limitations Will Fracture the 'Net" Nemertes argued that Internet access capacity will become insufficient to handle demand as early as 2010 These findings have supported the positions on the need to increase internet capacity taken by the Internet Innovation Alliance (IIA),. The findings and conclusions of such reports have been widely criticized  though Nemertes argued that data caps and restrictions on streaming services validated their findings.

References

External links

Information technology consulting firms of the United States
Research and analysis firms of the United States